The Roman Catholic Diocese of Blumenau is a diocese located in the city of Blumenau in the Ecclesiastical province of Florianópolis in Brazil.

History
 April 19, 2000: Established as Diocese of Blumenau from the Metropolitan Archdiocese of Florianópolis, Diocese of Joinville and Diocese of Rio do Sul

Leadership
 Bishops of Blumenau (Roman rite)
 Bishop Angélico Sândalo Bernardino (April 19, 2000 – February 18, 2009)
 Bishop Giuseppe Negri, P.I.M.E., (February 18, 2009 – October 29, 2014), appointed Coadjutor Bishop of Santo Amaro, São Paulo
 Bishop Rafael Biernaski (June 24, 2015 – present)

References
 GCatholic.org
 Catholic Hierarchy
 Diocese website (Portuguese) 

Roman Catholic dioceses in Brazil
Christian organizations established in 2000
Blumenau, Roman Catholic Diocese of
Roman Catholic dioceses and prelatures established in the 20th century
Blumenau